Bermsgrün is a district in Schwarzenberg, Saxony, Germany. It has a population of 1359 residents as of 9 May 2011.

References

Towns in Saxony